Samuel Pollard (20 April 1864 in Camelford, Cornwall – 16 September 1915 in Weining, China), known in Chinese as Bo Geli was a British Methodist missionary to China with the China Inland Mission who converted many of the A-Hmao (closely related to the Hmong) in Guizhou to Christianity, and who created a Miao script that is still in use today.

Biography 
Born the son of a Bible Christian Church preacher, Sam Pollard initially aimed for a career in the civil service. However, a conference in London in 1885 encouraged him to instead become a missionary. He was appointed a missionary in 1886, left the United Kingdom for China in 1887, and was posted to Yunnan province in 1888. He remained in China, as a missionary, until his death from typhoid.

In 1891 he was posted to a newly opened Bible Christian mission station in Zhaotong (referred to in contemporary sources in Wade–Giles as Chaotung), where he married Emmie Hainge. He began a Christian movement with the Big Flowery Miao in 1905 that spread to Zhaotong. Pollard also invented a script for the Miao languages called the Pollard Script (also sometimes called the "Ahmao script"). He credited the basic idea of the script to the Cree syllabary, "While working out the problem, we remembered the case of the syllabics used by James Evans, a Methodist missionary among the Indians of North America, and resolved to do as he had done". He also gave credit to a non-Miao Chinese pastor, "Stephen Lee assisted me very ably in this matter, and at last we arrived at a system".

Pollard never claimed any divine inspiration or vision in creating the script. Rather, he left a record of hard work, advice from others, and ideas from other scripts. At the beginning, he wrote, he "made an experiment in getting out a written language for the Miao", even writing out some symbols in his diary. He credited the basic idea of the script to the Cree syllabary (discussed above), "While working out the problem, we remembered the case of the syllabics used by a Methodist missionary among the Indians of North America, and resolved to do as he had done". He also gave credit to a Chinese pastor, "Stephen Lee assisted me very ably in this matter, and at last we arrived at a system". In another document he wrote "Mr. Stephen Lee and I are attempting to reduce the Miao language to a simply system of writing. The attempt may succeed or it may end… stillborn". He asked himself in his diary "How shall I manage to distinguish tones?” then later wrote how he had found the solution, adopting an idea from Pitman’s shorthand. In listing the phrases he used to describe the process of creating the script, there is clear indication of work, not revelation:  "we looked about", "working out the problem", "resolved to attempt", "assisted", "at last we arrived at a system", "adapting the system", "we found", "solved our problem". In all of this, we see no hint of specific revelation or any vision, only intellectual labor.

He used it to translate the New Testament. The script was unique in the fact that it used the initial consonant of a syllable, with the vowel placed above or below it, in order to indicate which tone the vowel was.

Pollard received pressure from some British sources that if the Roman script was not suitable, he should consider using the Burmese alphabet. He did not accept this suggestions, but Pollard did leave the door open for switching over to Roman letters, writing in 1906, "It is quite possible later on to turn our system into Romanised, where there is a successful Romanised system in use which will solve the tone difficulty". A large part of Pollard’s motivation for creating his script was to have a way to adequately mark the sounds of the language, especially the tones. It has remained in use for 90 years, despite efforts to supersede it.

During his mission he travelled extensively, founding churches, training other missionaries, performing the role of language examiner, and arguing the causes of Miao Christians. He also fought against the oppression of the Miao, this often led to clashes with Chinese officials. He was nearly beaten to death at the orders of a greedy landlord.

Death 
After Pollard's death in 1915, he was buried in the mountains near the Shimenkan mission station, contemporary Weining Yi, Hui, and Miao Autonomous County. The mission prospered for another 35 years until 1950, when the CCP ordered all English missionaries to cease proselytizing and leave the country. His grave and the county were closed to foreigners until 1995, when Xinhua announced that work had been taken to restore Pollard's tomb which they now declared to be a national monument.

Dedications 

The  main building at the Hopkins-Nanjing Center in Nanjing, China, is known as the Samuel Pollard Building. It houses the Center's library, classrooms and conference space, and administration offices.

The building was dedicated in 2007 as part of the Center's twentieth anniversary celebrations, which included keynotes by former Secretary of State Henry Kissinger and former Chinese Foreign Minister Qian Qichen.

Bibliography 
  republished posthumously as:

See also 

 Christianity in Guizhou
 List of China Inland Mission missionaries in China

References

What supports what

Sources used 

 
 
 
  — Dingle describes how Sam Pollard used positioning of vowel marks relative to consonants to indicate tones
  — Morrison recounts meeting Sam Pollard and his wife at the Bible Christian Mission in 1894
  — reports on an article in The Sunday Times describing the continuing influence of the work of Sam Pollard after his death
  — quotes Sam Pollard in his efforts to instil a "new-born sense of shame" into his converts, to curb behaviour that he regarded as being drunkenness and promiscuity
  — Lemoine reports that after 1949 the Pollard script was retained as a symbol of cultural identity and pride
 
  — the School of Oriental and African Studies Library holds most of Sam Pollard's notes, diaries, letters, and papers

Further reading 
 
 
 , also published as:
 
  — full Chinese translations of books about the ministry of Po Geli (Sam Pollard) including The Story of the Miao, In Unknown China, Stone Gateway, and the Flowery Miao
 
 
  — Part II includes Norma Diamond's study of Sam Pollard's work
 
 
  — Written by Samuel Pollard's son, a well-known professor of physics and biophysics. "Sermon" 17, The Story of Sam Pollard, written for Atheists offers a very personal look at Sam Pollard's life and motivation
 
 
 
 Yu Suee Yan. (2011.) The story of the Big Flowery Miao Bible. The Bible Translator vol. 62, no. 4: 207-215.

External links 
 The Pollard script
 Archive papers of Sam Pollard are held by SOAS Special Collections

1864 births
1915 deaths
People from Camelford
English Methodist missionaries
British expatriates in China
Methodist missionaries in China
Translators of the Bible into China's tribal languages
Creators of writing systems
History of Guizhou
19th-century translators
Cornish Christian missionaries
Missionary linguists
Christianity in Guizhou
Christianity in Yunnan